The Transperth C-series trains are a planned class of electric multiple units part of Alstom's X'Trapolis family of trains for Transperth that are being delivered as part of Metronet.

The new trains will feature hard-worn flooring instead of the carpet-laid floor of the A and B series, making it easy to clean flooring.

History 
In April 2018, the Public Transport Authority called for expressions of interest to build 41 6-carriage electric multiple units. Three consortia were shortlisted to bid:
 Alstom
 Bombardier / EDI Rail
 Momentum West, a consortium of CAF and UGL

On 18 August 2019, Alstom was announced as the successful bidder. The trains will be assembled in Bellevue. Twenty-five sets will be delivered to provide rolling stock for network extensions as part of the Metronet project, while the other sixteen will replace the A-series stock from 2023.

In December 2019, Alstom released details of the contract and early renders of what the new trains will look like. Under the contract, worth approximately €800 million (AUD1.3 billion), Alstom will be responsible for the design, supply, manufacturing, testing and commissioning of 41 six-car electric-multiple-unit (EMU) trains for suburban services and two, three-car diesel-multiple-unit (DMU) trains for the Australind, which includes 50% local content, twenty years maintenance of the EMU trains and maintenance support services for the DMU trains.

From 3 April to 18 April 2021, Metronet opened an exhibit titled All Aboard METRONET held in Yagan Square, in which a two thirds length mock-up of a single car of a C Series was made available for the general public to view. This would be the first physical appearance of the C Series design. This mock-up showed off the new seating arrangement and styling for which the new trains will have a mixture of high back seats and bench seating, the new type of doors with the buttons located on the doors themselves and a new graphical passenger information display.

On 7 June 2021 (Western Australia Day), the Railcar Manufacturing and Assembly Facility was officially opened at the Bellevue Railcar Depot, and handed over to Alstom to commence manufacturing the trains. The first train was revealed on 14 August 2022, with twelve months of testing along the Joondalup and Mandurah lines set to occur before they are put in passenger service. Testing along the Joondalup line between Clarkson station and Butler station commenced on 23 December 2022.

References

External links 

 Metronet C-Series rail cars

Alstom multiple units
Electric multiple units of Western Australia
Public transport in Perth, Western Australia
Proposed public transport in Australia
25 kV AC multiple units